Devils Gullet is a protected area in Tasmania, Australia. It is part of the Tasmanian Wilderness.
From the reserve, visitors unable or unwilling to hike the challenging Walls of Jerusalem National Park can catch a glimpse of the stunning landscape. The viewing platform is located near Mole Creek Karst National Park.

See also
 Protected areas of Tasmania

State reserves of Tasmania
Wilderness areas of Tasmania